The 9th NEFTA Film Awards were organized by the Nepal Film Technician Association and awarded in 2016. The awards ceremony was scheduled for December 23, 2016, in Dubai.

Nominations

See also
NEFTA Film Awards

References

2016 film awards